Ciro's (later known as Ciro's Le Disc) was a nightclub on Sunset Boulevard in West Hollywood, California owned by William Wilkerson. Opened in 1940, Ciro's became a popular nightspot for celebrities. The nightclub closed in 1957 and was reopened as a rock club in 1965. After a few name changes, it eventually became The Comedy Store in 1972.

History 
Club Seville opened New Year’s Eve 1935. It featured a "crystal dance floor with subsurface fish, fountains and colored lights in its Crystal Marine Room." 

The building was remodeled and Ciro's was opened in January 1940 by entrepreneur William Wilkerson at 8433 Sunset Boulevard. Wilkerson had also opened Cafe Trocadero, in 1934, and the restaurant La Rue, both on the Strip, and would later originate The Flamingo in Las Vegas, only to have control of the resort wrested from him by mobster Benjamin "Bugsy" Siegel. Wilkerson sold Ciro’s to his longtime right-hand man Herman Hover, who would make sure Ciro’s was an important Hollywood hotspot until 1959.  Hover filed for bankruptcy in 1959, and Ciro's was sold at public auction for $350,000.
Ciro's combined a luxe baroque interior and an unadorned exterior and became a famous hangout for movie people of the 1940s and 1950s. It was one of the places to be seen and guaranteed being written about in the gossip columns of Hedda Hopper, Louella Parsons, and Florabel Muir.
  
Among the galaxy of celebrities who frequented Ciro's were Marilyn Monroe, Humphrey Bogart and Lauren Bacall, Frank Sinatra, James Dean, Ava Gardner, Sidney Poitier, Anita Ekberg, Lucille Ball and Desi Arnaz, Joan Crawford, Betty Grable, Marlene Dietrich, Ginger Rogers, Ronald Reagan, Dean Martin, Jerry Lewis, Mickey Rooney, Cary Grant, George Raft, George Burns and Gracie Allen, Judy Garland, June Allyson and Dick Powell, Mamie Van Doren, Jimmy Stewart, Jack Benny, Peter Lawford, and Lana Turner (who often said Ciro's was her favorite nightspot) among many others. During his first visit to Hollywood in the late 1940s, future President John F. Kennedy dined at Ciro's. 

In 1965, Ciro's reopened as the rock club Ciro's Le Disc. Ike & Tina Turner performed at the newly opened club with Jimi Hendrix as part of their band. The Byrds got their start at Ciro's Le Disc in 1965. Accounts of the period (reproduced in the sleeve notes to The Preflyte Sessions box set) describe a "church-like" atmosphere, with interpretive dancing. The club also served as the host during the recording of the 1965 Dick Dale album Rock Out With Dick Dale & His Del-Tones: Live At Ciro's. Two years later, it was renamed The Kaleidoscope. In 1968, the club was called It's Boss. In 1969, it was known as Patch 2. The site of Ciro's became The Comedy Store in 1972.

Notable performers

Ciro's club and restaurant chain
The name Ciro's comes from Italian born Ciro Capozzi who founded the first Ciro's bar in Monaco around 1892, next to the café Riche in the newly built Galerie Charles III. According to the story of James Gordon Bennett Jr., having a difference about a table on the terrasse, he bought the café Riche and gave it to Ciro who named it the Ciro's. In 1911, Ciro Capozzi sold the name to an English consortium (including William Poulett, 7th Earl Poulett as main investor)  who open the Deauville Ciro's (still existing as a restaurant belonging to the Groupe Lucien Barrière), the Paris Ciro's in 1912, and the London one in 1915. Ciro's became a European high society restaurant chain with branches in Monte Carlo, Paris, London (where Audrey Hepburn danced before her film career), and Deauville. Bartender Harry MacElhone,  famous for Harry's New York Bar, first worked at Ciro's in London after World War I.

"Ciro's was a hip London establishment (before another popular one opened up in Los Angeles in 1940), that had as their bartender Harry McElhone (author of ABC of Cocktails), at which Jimmy took over when Harry went off to Paris. ..." (Ross Bolton)

"Louis Adlon, grandson of the proprietor of Berlin’s Hotel Adlon opened Hollywood’s first iteration of Ciro’s in 1934 (with Erich Alexander and George Sorel) Located on Hollywood Boulevard, the club was informally part of a chain with locations in London, Paris and Berlin. The Hollywood Ciro’s was not a success, apparently, because it soon folded."

References

Former music venues in California
Jazz clubs in Los Angeles
Music venues completed in 1940
Music venues in Los Angeles
Nightclubs in Los Angeles County, California
Restaurants in West Hollywood, California
Defunct restaurants in Hollywood, Los Angeles